

W 

 
 
 
 1704 Wachmann
 
 
 
 
 
 
 
 
 
 
 
 
 
 
 
 
 
 
 
 
 
 1695 Walbeck
 
 
 
 
 
 
 
 
 
 
 
 
 877 Walküre
 
 
 1153 Wallenbergia
 2114 Wallenquist
 
 
 987 Wallia
 
 
 3198 Wallonia
 256 Walpurga
 1946 Walraven
 
 
 
 
 
 
 
 
 
 
 
 
 
 
 
 
 
 
 
 
 
 890 Waltraut
 
 
 
 
 1057 Wanda
 
 
 
 
 
 
 
 
 
 
 
 
 
 
 
 
 
 
 
 
 
 
 
 
 
 
 
 
 
 
 
 
 
 
 
 
 
 
 
 
 
 
 
 
 
 
 
 886 Washingtonia
 
 5756 Wassenbergh
 4765 Wasserburg
 
 
 
 
 
 
 
 
 1822 Waterman
 
 
 
 729 Watsonia
 
 
 7784 Watterson
 1798 Watts
 
 
 
 
 
 
 
 
 
 
 
 
 
 
 
 
 
 
 
 
 
 
 
 
 
 
 
 
 
 
 
 
 
 
 
 
 
 
 
 
 
 
 
 4085 Weir
 
 
 
 
 
 
 
 
 
 
 
 
 
 
 
 
 1721 Wells
 
 
 3682 Welther
 
 
 
 
 
 
 
 
 15268 Wendelinefroger
 
 
 
 
 
 
 
 
 
 
 
 
 
 
 
 
 
 621 Werdandi
 
 226 Weringia
 
 
 
 1302 Werra
 
 
 
 
 
 
 
 
 2017 Wesson
 2022 West
 
 
 
 
 
 
 
 
 
 930 Westphalia
 
 
 
 
 
 
 
 
 
 
 1940 Whipple
 
 
 
 
 
 
 
 
 2301 Whitford
 
 
 
 
 
 
 931 Whittemora
 
 
 
 
 
 
 
 
 
 
 
 
 
 
 
 
 
 
 
 
 
 
 
 
 
 
 274301 Wikipedia
 
 
 
 
 1941 Wild
 
 
 9999 Wiles
 
 
 
 392 Wilhelmina
 
 
 
 
 
 1688 Wilkens
 
 
 
 
 
 
 
 
 
 
 
 
 
 
 
 
 
 
 
 
 
 
 
 
 
 
 
 
 
 
 
 
 
 
 
 
 
 
 1763 Williams
 
 
 
 
 
 
 
 
 
 
 
 
 51829 Williemccool
 
 
 
 
 
 
 
 23712 Willpatrick
 
 
 4015 Wilson-Harrington
 
 
 
 
 
 747 Winchester
 
 
 
 1556 Wingolfia
 1575 Winifred
 
 
 
 
 
 
 
 
 
 
 
 2044 Wirt
 
 3402 Wisdom
 717 Wisibada
 
 
 
 
 
 
 
 2732 Witt
 
 
 
 
 
 852 Wladilena
 
 
 
 
 
 4608 Wodehouse
 
 
 
 
 
 
 
 
 
 
 
 
 
 827 Wolfiana
 
 
 
 
 
 
 
 
 
 
 
 
 
 
 
 
 
 1660 Wood
 13732 Woodall
 
 
 
 
 
 
 
 
 
 
 
 
 
 
 690 Wratislavia
 
 
 1747 Wright
 
 1765 Wrubel
 
 2752 Wu Chien-Shiung

See also 
 List of minor planet discoverers
 List of observatory codes

References 
 

Lists of minor planets by name